Leonardo Fornaroli (born 3 December 2004) is an Italian racing driver who is currently competing in the 2023 FIA Formula 3 Championship for Trident. He is the 2022 Formula Regional European rookie champion.

Career

Karting 
Fornaroli began karting competitively in his native Italy around the age of ten, first winning the Mini Academy class of the Championkart championship in 2016 before moving up to X30 Junior the following year. He came runner-up in the 2017 X30 Challenge Italy, in a season that also included entry to international IAME events, but found more success in 2018, when he was third in the Italian Karting Championship and made his full-time European debut in the WSK Super Master Series. Fornaroli's final year in karting would prove to be his best, as he was a front-runner in the 2019 WSK Euro Series on his OK debut and finished 3rd in the prestigious Trofeo Andrea Margutti. At the end of the year, he was invited to participate in the 16th edition of the annual Supercorso Federale event at Vallelunga, as one of five young karting talents selected by ACI Sport and the Ferrari Driver Academy.

Lower formulae

2020 
Having tested a Formula 4 car for the first time at the Supercorso Federale, 2020 would see Fornaroli make his debut in the Italian F4 Championship, driving for sportscar racing team Iron Lynx, which extended its program to single-seaters. He repaid the faith straightaway, taking a solid fourth-place finish on debut at Misano. He would go on to score 8 top-five finishes from 20 races, including a podium at Monza, and finished 9th in the overall standings on 108 points. At the end of the year, as an award for his performances, Fornaroli was again invited to ACI Sport's Supercorso Federale, together with F4 rivals Gabriele Minì, Francesco Pizzi, Andrea Rosso and four karting drivers.

2021 

In 2021 Fornaroli remained in the series with Iron Lynx, partnering new Ferrari Driver Academy recruit Maya Weug and Pietro Armanni. He was the highest-placed driver in the 2020 standings to return. Consistency would once again prove to be his biggest asset, as he was in the points in every race he finished. Two very strong weekends at Misano, where he clinched his first F4 victory from his first pole before scoring two further podiums, and Imola would initially see Fornaroli as the only real threat for eventual champion Oliver Bearman. He would however lose out shortly after, despite a second pole and more podiums at the Red Bull Ring and Mugello, and reached the season finale at Monza in third position, as part of a four-way fight for second. The weekend did not go to plan for him, as he faced a lowly 9th position, a retirement and a DNS that eventually dropped him to fifth in the standings, behind runner-up Tim Tramnitz and Prema's Kirill Smal and Sebastián Montoya. Fornaroli's closest teammate, Armanni, finished 23 places and 172 points behind him.

Formula Regional 

In 2022 Fornaroli made the step up to Formula Regional, first doing a partial campaign in the Asian Championship for Hitech Grand Prix, with a fourth-place qualifying result and a fifth-place finish as highlights, before returning to Europe for the main season with new team Trident, alongside F4 rival Tramnitz and Roman Bilinski. Consistency would prove to be the Italian's biggest trait, as he went on to score points in 15 of the 20 races on his and his team's debut season. He finished 8th in the overall standings, as the best-placed rookie and well ahead of both of his teammates. His best finish was a fourth place in race one at the Hungaroring.

FIA Formula 3 
At the end of September 2022, Fornaroli partook in the FIA Formula 3 post-season test with Trident, partnering Oliver Goethe and FRECA rival Gabriel Bortoleto on all three days. On 3 December 2022, on his 18th birthday, it was announced that Fornaroli would be part of the team's 2023 line-up alongside Bortoleto and Goethe.

Karting record

Karting career summary

Racing record

Racing career summary 

* Season still in progress.

Complete Italian F4 Championship results 
(key) (Races in bold indicate pole position) (Races in italics indicate fastest lap)

Complete Formula Regional Asian Championship results 
(key) (Races in bold indicate pole position) (Races in italics indicate the fastest lap of top ten finishers)

Complete Formula Regional European Championship results 
(key) (Races in bold indicate pole position) (Races in italics indicate fastest lap)

Complete FIA Formula 3 Championship results 
(key) (Races in bold indicate pole position) (Races in italics indicate fastest lap)

References

External links 
 

Living people
2004 births
Italian racing drivers
Italian F4 Championship drivers
ADAC Formula 4 drivers
Formula Regional European Championship drivers
Formula Regional Asian Championship drivers
Hitech Grand Prix drivers
Trident Racing drivers
FIA Formula 3 Championship drivers
Iron Lynx drivers